Illumination is an important concept in visual arts.

The illumination of the subject of a drawing or painting is a key element in creating an artistic piece, and the interplay of light and shadow is a valuable method in the artist's toolbox. The placement of the light sources can make a considerable difference in the type of message that is being presented. Multiple light sources can wash out any wrinkles in a person's face, for instance, and give a more youthful appearance. In contrast, a single light source, such as harsh daylight, can serve to highlight any texture or interesting features.

Processing of illumination is an important concept in computer vision and computer graphics.

See also
Chiaroscuro

Artistic techniques
Lighting
Computer graphics
Image processing